Joseph Wendel (May 27, 1901 – December 31, 1960) was a German Cardinal of the Roman Catholic Church who served as Archbishop of Munich and Freising from 1952 until his death, and was elevated to the cardinalate in 1953 by Pope Pius XII.

Biography
Joseph Wendel was born in Blieskastel, and studied at the seminary in Speyer, and the Pontifical German-Hungarian College and the Pontifical Gregorian University in Rome. From the Gregorian he obtained doctorates in philosophy and theology. Wendel was ordained to the priesthood on October 30, 1927, and then did pastoral work in Speyer, also serving as director of Caritas, until 1941.

On April 4, 1941, he was appointed Coadjutor Bishop of Speyer and Titular Bishop of Lebessus. He received his episcopal consecration on the following June 29 from Bishop Ludwig Sebastian, with Bishops Matthias Ehrenfried and Joseph Kolb serving as co-consecrators. Wendel succeeded Sebastian as Bishop of Speyer on May 20, 1943, being installed on June 4 of that same year. During World War II, he strongly defended the rights of the Church and humanity. Wendel became known as the "Bishop of Peace" following the war because of his efforts to restore West Germany's good will

Pope Pius XII named him Archbishop of Munich and Freising on August 9, 1952 (three Bishops of Speyer have become Archbishop of Munich and Freising, the others being Michael von Faulhaber and Friedrich Wetter), and created him Cardinal Priest of S. Maria Nuova in the consistory of January 12, 1953. On February 4, 1956, Wendel became the Apostolic Vicar of the Catholic Military Ordinariate of Germany. He was one of the cardinal electors in the 1958 papal conclave, which selected Pope John XXIII. The German prelate also made gestures of ecumenism to Protestants, and organized the International Eucharistic Congress in Munich in 1960.

Shortly after delivering his New Year's Eve sermon, Wendel died from a heart attack in Munich, at age 59. He is buried in the metropolitan cathedral of that same city.

References

External links
Archdiocese of Munich and Freising - in German
Cardinals of the Holy Roman Church
Catholic-Hierarchy

|-

1901 births
1960 deaths
People from Saarpfalz-Kreis
Cardinals created by Pope Pius XII
20th-century German cardinals
Roman Catholic archbishops of Munich and Freising
Grand Crosses 1st class of the Order of Merit of the Federal Republic of Germany
Burials at Munich Frauenkirche
German Roman Catholic archbishops